Betty Beckers (3 May 1925, in Villeneuve-Saint-Georges – 21 December 1982) was a French actress.

Filmography

External links 
 

1925 births
1982 deaths
People from Villeneuve-Saint-Georges
French film actresses
20th-century French actresses